Paul Scates (also known as Paul Stephen Scates) is an English  writer,  presenter, and mental health campaigner

Personal life
Scates was born in Bournemouth, England.  He speaks openly about having bipolar disorder and surviving child sexual abuse.  Following a mental crisis, Scates found himself in and out of medical care.

Bibliography 
That Lightbulb Moment (2019) Published by Trigger Publishing.

Media appearances 
Spendaholics (2006)
Dinner Date (2012) 
The £100K Drop (2012)
The World’s Maddest Job Interview (2012) 
Finding Hope - Paul Scates (Documentary) (2014)
Rachel Bruno: My Dad and Me (2013) 
Sky News Today (2016)
Granada Reports (2016)
Head Talks (2017)
Jeremy Vine  (2016)  
Victoria Derbyshire (2016-2017)
BBC Breakfast (2017)
5 News (2017) 
Britains Inspirational Children and Young People’s Awards (2018) - Presenter
BBC South Today (2018) 
Mind Media Awards (2018)

References

English writers
Living people
1979 births